Bathtub Blues is an album by folk singer/guitarist Greg Brown, released in 1993. It is directed towards children and uses a children's chorus on many of the songs.

Reception

Writing for Allmusic, music critic Tim Sheridan called the album "As kids' records go, you could do a lot worse..."

Track listing
All songs by Greg Brown except as noted.
 "I See the Moon" (Public Doman)
 "Late Night Radio"
 "Bathtub Blues"
 "Payday" (Brown, Hurt)
 "So Long, You Old Tooth"
 "Green Leaf"
 "Young Robin"
 "Down at the Sea Hotel"
 "Shake Sugaree" (Cotten)
 "Flabbergabble"
 "I Remember When"
 "Four Wet Pigs"
 "Monsters & Giants"
 "Two Little Boys" (Public Domain)
 "You Might as Well Go to Sleep"
 "I See the Moon" (Public Domain)

Personnel
Greg Brown – vocals, guitar, harmonica
Acacia Bjerke – vocals
Vanessa Bjerke – vocals
Constie Brown – vocals
Zoe Brown – vocals
Amara Hank – vocals
Karene Hank – vocals
Pat Donohue – guitar
Gordon Johnson – bass

References

Greg Brown (folk musician) albums
1993 albums
Red House Records albums